This is a list of American houses by state.

California
Bidwell Mansion: home of John Bidwell and Annie Bidwell in Chico, California
Bourn Mansion; Georgian-style mansion built for William Bowers Bourn II and his wife, Agnes Moody Bourn in Pacific Heights, San Francisco, California
Carolands: the 65,000 sq ft mansion of Harriet Pullman Carolan in Hillsborough, California.
Eames House: the residence of Charles and Ray Eames
El Fureidis: the Bertram Grosvenor Goodhue house owned by Sergey Grishin in Montecito, California
Filoli: a free Georgian style mansion built for William Bowers Bourn II and his wife, Agnes Moody Bourn in Woodside, California; the setting for the American soap opera Dynasty
Gamble House: the residence of David Gamble (of Procter & Gamble) in Pasadena, California built by Greene & Greene.
Garden of Alla: an estate owned by actress Alla Nazimova in West Hollywood, California during the 1920s. It was demolished in 1959.
George W. Marston House: 1905 home of George Marston and wife, Anna Marston. Located in Balboa Park, San Diego, California.
Harold Lloyd Estate: is a large mansion and landscaped estate located in the Benedict Canyon section of Beverly Hills, California; residence of silent film star Harold Lloyd
Hearst Castle: the grand mansion of publisher William Randolph Hearst at San Simeon, California
Lovell House by Richard Neutra
Neverland Ranch, the home of musician Michael Jackson, in Santa Barbara County, California
The Playboy Mansion: magazine publisher Hugh Hefner's mansion
Pickfair: the former Beverly Hills, California residence of film actors and married couple Mary Pickford and Douglas Fairbanks.
The Manor: a Châteauesque mansion and the former residence of television producer Aaron Spelling, it is located in the Holmby Hills neighborhood of Los Angeles, California, and is currently listed as the most expensive home in the United States
Von Sternberg House
Winchester Mystery House: the haunted mansion of Winchester Rifle heiress, Sarah Winchester
Wrigley Mansion: former home of William Wrigley, Jr., of the famous chewing gum company, now headquarters of the Tournament of Roses Association in Pasadena, California

Colorado
Hala Ranch: an estate located just north of Aspen, Colorado, in the Rocky Mountains, originally purchased and given its name by part-time resident Prince Bandar bin Sultan of Saudi Arabia
Molly Brown House: home of Unsinkable Molly Brown, the famous RMS Titanic survivor in Denver, Colorado

Connecticut
Gillette Castle: the eccentric residence of actor William Gillette in East Haddam, Connecticut
Lockwood-Mathews Mansion: a 62-room Second Empire mansion open to the public in Norwalk, Connecticut
Mark Twain House: the American High Gothic style house where Samuel Langhorne Clemens (Mark Twain) and his family lived from 1874 to 1891 in Hartford, Connecticut.
Loomis Homestead: one the oldest timber-frame houses in America in Windsor, Connecticut.

Delaware
Hagley Museum and Library: the Brandywine Valley home of Eleuthere Irenee du Pont in Wilmington, Delaware
Nemours: the 300-acre French estate of Alfred I. du Pont in Wilmington, Delaware
Winterthur: the fifth largest residence in America was home to industrialist Henry Francis du Pont in Winterthur, Delaware

District of Columbia
Dumbarton Oaks: the mansion of Robert Woods Bliss in Washington, D.C.
The White House: designed by James Hoban in the Palladian style, it is the official residence and workplace of the president of the United States.
The Wylie Mansion: the former residence of judge Andrew Wylie in Washington, D.C.

Florida
Cà d'Zan: John Ringling mansion, Sarasota, Florida
Mar-a-Lago: a mansion and estate in Palm Beach, Florida; the former residence of Marjorie Merriweather Post and Edward F. Hutton; the current residence of Donald Trump; it was added as a National Historic Landmark in 1980.
Villa Vizcaya: James Deering mansion, Miami, Florida
Whitehall: the estate of Florida developer and Standard Oil partner Henry Morrison Flagler in Palm Beach, Florida.

Georgia
Margaret Mitchell House and Museum: the house where Margaret Mitchell wrote Gone with the Wind

Illinois
Glessner House: Chicago, H. H. Richardson, architect
Hull House: Jane Addams' settlement house for immigrants and the poor in Chicago, Illinois
Robie House: Frank Lloyd Wright-designed residence, Chicago, a U.S. National Historical Landmark

Louisiana
Laura Plantation: a Créole-style historic plantation in St. James Parish, Louisiana, on the West Bank of the Mississippi River near Vacherie, Louisiana
Oak Alley Plantation: a historic plantation located on the Mississippi River in the community of Vacherie, Louisiana; residence of Jacques Telesphore Roman.
St. Joseph Plantation: a historic plantation located on the west bank of the Mississippi River in the town of Vacherie, Louisiana; residence of Josephine Aime Ferrie

Maine
Bush compound: the summer home of U.S. President George H. W. Bush located adjacent to the Atlantic Ocean in southern Maine, near the town of Kennebunkport; the mansion was purchased by St. Louis banker George Herbert Walker and has remained as a summer retreat for the Bush family for over a century.
Wedding Cake House: the Gothic revival mansion of ship captain George Bourne in Kennebunk, Maine.

Maryland
Evergreen House: the mansion of B&O Railroad president John W. Garrett in Baltimore, Maryland.
Hampton Mansion: the former largest home in America was the home to 7 generations of the Ridgely family in Towson, Maryland
Homewood: the historical 1800 Federal-style house of Charles Carroll Jr. in Baltimore, Maryland
Edgar Allan Poe House and Museum, Baltimore, Maryland
Sagamore Farm: the 1920s horse breeding farm of Alfred G. Vanderbilt II in Baltimore County, Maryland, now home to Under Armour CEO Kevin Plank
The Cloisters: the 1928 castle of Sumner and Dudrea Parker made from portions of historic estates in America and Europe, located in Lutherville, Maryland.

Massachusetts
Beauport: the waterfront summer residence of Henry Davis Sleeper in Gloucester, Massachusetts
Castle Hill: a stately mansion and estate of 21 outbuildings situated in Ipswich, Massachusetts north of Boston; the summer residence of Richard T. Crane, Jr.
Elephant House: the house of Edward Gorey, artist, writer, illustrator, playwright, and puppeteer
Elm Court: the largest Shingle style architecture house in America was home to William Douglas Sloane and Emily Thorn Vanderbilt in Lenox, Massachusetts 
Hammond Castle: the 1920s stone castle and laboratory of inventor John Hays Hammond, Jr. in Gloucester, Massachusetts
House of the Seven Gables: fictionalized by author Nathaniel Hawthorne in Salem, Massachusetts
Kennedy Compound: a clapboard (architecture) home located in Hyannis Port, Massachusetts, and the residence of the Kennedy family including American businessman and political figure Joseph P. Kennedy, Sr., his wife Rose Fitzgerald Kennedy, and their three sons, U.S. President John F. Kennedy and U.S. Senators Robert F. Kennedy and Ted Kennedy
Naumkeag: the Shingle Style summer residence of Joseph Hodges Choate in The Berkshires
Peacefield: a Colonial style mansion and the former residence of U.S. President John Adams, and other members of the Adams family, located in Quincy, Massachusetts near Boston
The Mount: a country house in Lenox, Massachusetts, the home of noted American author Edith Wharton, who designed the house and its grounds.
Ventfort Hall: the Jacobean mansion of George and Sarah Morgan which is now the Gilded Age Museum in Lenox, Massachusetts.

Michigan
Meadow Brook Hall: home of Matilda Dodge Wilson in Rochester Hills, Michigan
 Snowflake: home designed by Frank Lloyd Wright in Plymouth Township, Michigan

New Hampshire 
 The Frost Place: home of Pulitzer Prize winning poet Robert Frost in Franconia, New Hampshire, in the White Mountains Region.

New York
Arden House: the 100,000 sq ft mansion of railroad magnate Edward Henry Harriman in Harriman, New York
Boldt Castle: legendary island estate, one of America's largest private residences
Boscobel: the Federal style estate of States Dyckman by the Hudson River in Garrison, New York
Camp Pine Knot: the earliest of the Great Camps of the Adirondacks, a National Historic Landmark
Charles W. Goodyear House; home of lawyer and businessman Charles W. Goodyear in Buffalo, New York
Coindre Hall: the 30,000 square foot mansion of pharmaceutical magnate George McKesson Brown in Huntington, New York
Coe Hall: the 67-room mansion of William R. Coe in Oyster Bay, New York
Cornelius Vanderbilt II House: the largest private residence ever constructed in New York City was home to the eldest grandson of tycoon Cornelius Vanderbilt
Dark Island: fantasy castle by Ernest Flagg "(Singer Castle")
Eagle's Nest: the residence of William Kissam Vanderbilt II in Centerport, New York, now home to a museum and planetarium
Edgewater: in Barrytown, New York, built about 1825.
The Frick Collection: former residence of steel magnate Henry Clay Frick, adjacent Central Park in Manhattan, New York City
Gracie Mansion: official residence of New York City's mayor 
Harriet Phillips Bungalow
Harbor Hill: the Gold Coast, Long Island estate of Clarence Hungerford Mackay was one of the 10 largest residences in America
Hempstead House: the massive Gould-Guggenheim estate, and now park, on Long Island's gold coast in Sands Point, New York
Hyde Park: the Hudson Valley estate of Frederick W. Vanderbilt.
Indian Neck Hall: a Georgian-style country residence of Frederick Gilbert Bourne located on the Great South Bay in Oakdale, New York
Inisfada: the huge Tudor Revival mansion of Nicholas Frederic Brady on Long Island
Kykuit: the residence of oil tycoon John D. Rockefeller in Tarrytown on the Hudson River
Lower East Side Tenement Museum, a six-story brick tenement building that was home to an estimated 7,000 people, from over 20 nations, between 1863 and 1935, in New York City.
Mills Mansion: the Beaux-Arts mansion of financier Ogden Mills on the Hudson River in Staatsburg, New York.
Oheka Castle: also known as the Otto Kahn Estate, it is a large country estate located on the Gold Coast of Long Island's north shore, at Huntington, Suffolk County, New York, and was the residence of financier and philanthropist Otto Kahn
Petit Chateau: a Châteauesque mansion for William Kissam Vanderbilt and Alva Vanderbilt at 660 Fifth Avenue, New York City
Red Maples: in the Village of Southampton, New York.
Rose Hill Mansion: a restored Greek Revival mansion, a National Historic Landmark on Seneca Lake near Geneva, New York
Sagamore Camp: one of the Great Camps of the Adirondacks, a National Historic Landmark
Sagamore Hill (House): the home of President Theodore Roosevelt in Cove Neck, New York
Santanoni Preserve: one of the Great Camps of the Adirondacks, a National Historic Landmark
Springwood Estate: a Federal and Italianate mansion in Hyde Park, New York; the birthplace, lifelong home, and burial place of Franklin D. Roosevelt; added as a National Historic Site in 1945
Templeton: the Georgian Revival mansion of Alfred I. du Pont in Brookville, New York, now the DeSeversky Conference Center.
Westbrook: the Long Island mansion of William Bayard Cutting.
Winfield Hall: the ornate former residence of Frank Winfield Woolworth on Long Island in Glen Cove, New York

North Carolina
Biltmore Estate: the largest private home in the United States, built by George Vanderbilt; it is located outside Asheville, North Carolina

Ohio
Stan Hywet Hall and Gardens: a Tudor Revival country estate and the residence of Frank Seiberling in Akron, Ohio.
A Christmas Story House
Franklin Castle
Hawthorn Hill: Hawthorn Hill in Oakwood, Ohio, was the post-1914 home of Orville Wright.

Pennsylvania
Belmont Mansion: home of William Peters in Philadelphia, Pennsylvania
Clayton: the Pittsburgh home of industrialist Henry Clay Frick
Elstowe Manor: the 60,000 sq ft mansion of William L. Elkins in Elkins Park, Pennsylvania
Fallingwater: a Frank Lloyd Wright designed house in Bear Run, Pennsylvania
Grange Estate: Haverford, Pennsylvania, built in 1700, home of patriot John Ross
Lynnewood Hall: the Neoclassical mansion of industrialist and art collector Peter A. B. Widener in Elkins Park, Pennsylvania
Edgar Allan Poe National Historic Site, Philadelphia, Pennsylvania
Whitemarsh Hall: the 100,000 sq ft mansion of Edward T. Stotesbury designed by Horace Trumbauer outside Philadelphia, Pennsylvania.

Rhode Island
Beechwood: a mansion and the former residence of Caroline Astor in Newport, Rhode Island
Belcourt Castle: the summer mansion of Oliver Belmont, American banking heir
Blithewold: an 1896 waterfront mansion and gardens in Bristol, Rhode Island 
The Breakers: Newport, one of the most ambitious residences of the Gilded Age and an architectural landmark
Carey Mansion: a Châteauesque mansion and the residence of liquor millionaire Edson Bradley in Newport, Rhode Island
Chateau-sur-Mer: a French villa and the former residence of William Shepard Wetmore in Newport, Rhode Island
Chepstow: the 1860s Italianate summer home of Edmund Schermerhorn in Newport, Rhode Island
Hammersmith Farm: A Victorian mansion and estate in Newport, Rhode Island; the residence of Hugh D. Auchincloss and childhood home of Jacqueline Bouvier Kennedy Onassis
Isaac Bell House: a Shingle style house and "summer cottage" of Isaac Bell, Jr. in Newport, Rhode Island
Kingscote: a Gothic Revival house, museum, and the former residence of George Noble Jones in Newport, Rhode Island
Marble House: a Beaux-Arts architecture style mansion and residence of William Kissam Vanderbilt in Newport, Rhode Island
Miramar: a French neoclassical-style mansion and the summer residence of George Dunton Widener in Newport, Rhode Island
Ochre Court: a large Châteauesque mansion and the residence of Ogden Goelet in Newport, Rhode Island
The Elms: a Classical Revival mansion and the "summer cottage" of Edward Julius Berwind in Newport, Rhode Island
Rosecliff: a mansion built for Theresa Fair Oelrichs in Newport, Rhode Island
Rough Point: an English manorial style mansion and the residence of Frederick William Vanderbilt in Newport, Rhode Island
Vernon Court: a French classical style "summer cottage" of the young widow of Richard A. Gambrill, Anna Van Nest Gambrill in Newport, Rhode Island.
Vinland Estate: a Romanesque Revival sandstone mansion built for Catharine Lorillard Wolfe in Newport, Rhode Island.

Tennessee
Graceland: The former residence of singer Elvis Presley in Memphis, Tennessee

Texas
Southfork Ranch: a house built by Joe Duncan located near Plano, Texas; setting for the American soap opera Dallas
Texas Chainsaw House: (now the "Grand Central Cafe and Club Car Bar" restaurant) is a Victorian house now located on the grounds of the Antlers Hotel and was used in the filming of The Texas Chain Saw Massacre during 1973, when it was still in its original location in La Frontera.

Utah
The Beehive House: built in 1854 by Brigham Young, the house is located in Salt Lake City, Utah. The house gets its name from the beehive sculpture atop the house.
The Lion House: a second residence built by Brigham Young in 1856. Located in Salt Lake City, Utah, it was built to accommodate his large family due to a polygamous lifestyle. The house's name references a lion statue above the front entrance.

Vermont
Shelburne Farms: a large farming estate for Dr. William Seward Webb in Shelburne, Vermont

Virginia
Arlington House (the Custis-Lee Mansion): the home of Robert E. Lee, the grounds of which became Arlington National Cemetery
Monticello: the personal house of Thomas Jefferson, President of the United States
Mount Vernon: the residence of President George Washington in Alexandria, Virginia
Montpelier (Orange, Virginia): the residence of President James Madison and his family.

Washington
Xanadu 2.0: the sprawling, technologically advanced Earth sheltering home of Bill and Melinda Gates located in the side of a hill overlooking Lake Washington in Medina, Washington.

Wisconsin
Pabst Mansion: the Flemish Renaissance Revival style mansion of Captain Frederick Pabst in Milwaukee, Wisconsin

See also

 Architecture of the United States
 List of buildings and structures
 List of Gilded Age mansions

References

 
Houses, American
Houses